Progresso Associação do Sambizanga, also known as PAS, was a basketball club from Luanda, Angola. The basketball team competed in the top flight Angolan League, as well as other local competitions organized by the Angolan Basketball Federation.

After being relegated to the second division in the previous year, Progresso won the 2014 Angola Second Division Basketball Championship, thus being promoted to the 2015 BIC Basket

In 2017, the basketball team ceased operations.

Players

See also
Progresso do Sambizanga Football
Progresso do Sambizanga Handball
Angolan Basketball Federation

References

External links
 Africabasket profile

Sports clubs in Angola
Defunct basketball teams in Angola
Basketball teams established in 1975
Basketball teams disestablished in 2017
1975 establishments in Angola
2017 disestablishments in Africa